Lake Andrew (also called Lake Andrews) is a lake in Douglas County, in the U.S. state of Minnesota. Lake Andrew is a quiet, spring-fed lake located just south of Alexandria. Water clarity is considered good.

According to Warren Upham, Lake Andrews was probably named for a physician in Alexandria. Alternatively, according to Eugene Roth Family records, Lake Andrew was named for Andrew (Andreas) Roth, a prominent citizen and successful farmer of Douglas County.

See also
List of lakes in Minnesota

References

Lakes of Minnesota
Lakes of Douglas County, Minnesota